Az were Turkophone people from present-day Russia whose origins are still vague. Their existence is confirmed by the Tannu-Ola mountains inscriptions of Mugur-Sargol and Bayan-Kol and certain verses of the Göktürks, while describing the battles between the Göktürks and the Kyrgyz. According to the Bayan-Kol inscriptions, the Az were divided to many clans living in the region of Mugur west of the Tannu-Ola mountains. There are also writings from the 8th century (around 714 AD) in Uyghur sources about the uprising of the Az against the Göktürks.

The origin of the Az is disputed; but most researchers agree that they are without much doubt a people of non-Turkic origin who were influenced by neighboring Turkic people and became Turkophones.

The primary information on their language was collected by Matthias Castrén in 1845, with further research and information added later by the anthropologist Dmitry Anuchin. Meanwhile, Az were also hypothesized to be Turkicized descendants of the Iranian-speakers, particularly Asiani-Wusun.

The name Az has been suggested to live on in the names of several other peoples of southern Siberia: the Kamas ("Mountain Az"), the Karagas ("Black Az" or "Plains Az"), and the Khakas ("White Az").

Sources
Saadettin Gömeç: İslâm Öncesi Türk Tarihinin Kaynakları Üzerine. In: AÜ Dil ve Tarih-Coğrafya Fakültesi Tarih Bölümü Tarih Araştırmaları Dergisi, Bd. 20, Nr. 31, 2000, S. 51–92 (72f.)

References

Ethnic groups in Siberia
Extinct Turkic peoples